Chennai Super Kings (CSK) is an Indian Premier League (IPL) franchise cricket team based in Chennai, Tamil Nadu, India. Founded in 2008, the team plays its home matches at the M. A. Chidambaram Stadium in Chennai. The team is owned by India Cements Limited through the Chennai Super Kings Cricket Limited holding company. The team was suspended for two years from the IPL starting July 2015 due to the involvement of its owners in the 2013 IPL betting case, and won the title in its comeback season of 2018. The team is captained by MS Dhoni and coached by Stephen Fleming. In January 2022, CSK became India's first unicorn sports enterprise.

The Super Kings have won the IPL title four times (in 2010, 2011, 2018, and 2021), and have the highest win percentage of matches among all teams in the IPL (58.98%). They hold the records of most appearances in the playoffs (eleven) and the Final (nine) of the IPL.

In addition, they have also won the Champions League Twenty20 in 2010 and 2014. The brand value of the Super Kings in 2019 is estimated to be around ₹732 crore (roughly $104 million), making them one of the most valuable IPL franchises.

History 
In September 2007, the Board of Control for Cricket in India (BCCI) announced the establishment of the Indian Premier League, a Twenty20 competition to be started in 2008. In January 2008, the BCCI unveiled the owners of eight city-based franchises. The Chennai franchise was sold to the India Cements for $91 million, making it the fourth most expensive team in the league behind Mumbai, Bangalore and Hyderabad. India Cements acquired the rights to the franchise for 10 years. Former ICC Chairman N. Srinivasan was the de facto owner of the Chennai Super Kings, by means of his position as the vice-chairman and managing director of India Cements Ltd. The franchisee was transferred to a separate entity named Chennai Super Kings Cricket Ltd., after the Supreme Court of India struck down the controversial amendment to the BCCI constitution's clause 6.2.4 that allowed board officials to have a commercial interest in the IPL and the Champions League Twenty20 on 22 January 2015.

2008–2009: First seasons 

During the first player auctions for the inaugural IPL season conducted in January 2008, the Chennai franchise bought a number of contemporary star cricketers such as Mahendra Singh Dhoni, Matthew Hayden, Stephen Fleming, Muttiah Muralitharan and Michael Hussey. Dhoni became the costliest player of the auction, as the Chennai franchise bought him for $1.5 million. The franchise named Dhoni as the captain of the team and appointed Kepler Wessels as the head coach. They played their first game on 19 April 2008 against Kings XI Punjab at Mohali. The Super Kings won the game by 33 runs after posting 240/5 in 20 overs, which was the highest total of the tournament, a record surpassed by themselves in 2010. The Super Kings ended the league stage with eight wins from 14 games and finished third on the points table. They beat the Kings XI Punjab by 9 wickets in the semifinal. The Super Kings faced the Rajasthan Royals in the final of the IPL at Mumbai. Batting first, the Super Kings scored 163/5 in 20 overs and lost the game by 3 wickets off the final delivery of the match. They also earned a spot in the inaugural Champions League Twenty20 along with Rajasthan, but the tournament was canceled due to the 2008 Mumbai attacks and the Super Kings, along with Rajasthan, received $5 million each as compensation. Fleming, who had decided to retire from all forms of the game after the first season of the IPL, took over as the coach of the Super Kings team from Wessels for the next season which was to be held in South Africa.

For the 2009 season, the Super Kings bought English all-rounder Andrew Flintoff for $1.55 million at the auction making him the highest-paid IPL cricketer along with English teammate Kevin Pietersen who was bought for the same amount by Royal Challengers Bangalore. However, Flintoff played only 3 matches for them before suffering a knee injury that ruled him out of the season. The Super Kings were also without the services of Hussey who had decided to skip the IPL season to focus on The Ashes. The Super Kings finished with 17 points from 14 matches and earned a second place at the league table. However, at the semi-finals, their hopes of entering the final for a second time were crushed by the Royal Challengers who beat them by 6 wickets. The Super Kings opener Matthew Hayden, who scored 572 runs in 12 innings with 5 half-centuries at an average of 52 and strike-rate of 145, won the Orange Cap for the leading run-scorer of the season and was also adjudged Player of the Tournament.

2010: IPL and CLT20 double 

In 2010, the Super Kings struggled in the first half of the regular season, winning only two matches out of seven. They won four of their next five games in the season mainly due to the efforts of Murali Vijay and Suresh Raina. After a defeat at home to the Delhi Daredevils, the Super Kings were left with a must-win match against Kings XI Punjab at Dharamshala. The Super Kings won the match by six wickets as they chased down the target of 193 with two balls to spare with skipper Dhoni scoring an unbeaten 54 from 29 balls. Thus, with seven wins from 14 matches, Chennai finished with the same number of points as three other teams with two semi-final spots at stake. Chennai got the third place as they had the better net run rate of the four teams which finished on 14 points. In the semifinal, the Super Kings scored a modest 142/7 in 20 overs against the defending champions Deccan Chargers. But an inspired bowling spell from Doug Bollinger (4/13 in four overs) did the most damage as the Chargers were bowled out for 104. This gave the Super Kings a 38-run victory that took them to the final. The Super Kings faced the tournament favourites Mumbai Indians at their home ground in the final. Suresh Raina's 57 (35) helped the Super Kings recover from 68/3 after 12 overs to put up 168/5 at the end of their 20 overs. Then, their spin duo of Ravichandran Ashwin and Muralitharan conceded only 41 runs in the 8 overs bowled between them to help the Super Kings won the game by 22 runs and secure their first ever IPL title. With this, the Super Kings also qualified for the 2010 Champions League Twenty20 that was held in South Africa.

At the Champions League, the Super Kings were placed in Group A along with champions of Twenty20 competitions from Australia, South Africa, New Zealand and Sri Lanka. The Super Kings topped the Group table with three wins and a Super Over defeat to the Victorian Bushrangers. In the semi-final at Durban, the Super Kings comprehensively defeated IPL rivals Royal Challengers Bangalore by 52 runs. Raina won the Man of the Match for his unbeaten 94 off 48 balls. The Super Kings played their first CLT20 final at Johannesburg where they beat the Chevrolet Warriors by 8 wickets, becoming the first IPL team to win the CLT20. Murali Vijay won not only the Man of the Match in the final for his 58 but also the Golden Bat for scoring the most runs in the tournament and Ashwin, who was the leading wicket-taker, was adjudged the Player of the Series. At the end of the season, Matthew Hayden decided to retire from the IPL.

2011–2015: Success and suspension 

In 2011, as two new teams were added to the IPL, the IPL Governing Council declared that each franchise could retain a maximum of four players of their squad, only three of whom can be Indian players, and the rest of the international players would be put in the mega-auction. The Chennai franchise, keen to have the same set of core players, retained captain MS Dhoni, vice-captain Suresh Raina, Murali Vijay and all-rounder Albie Morkel for a total of $4.5 million. The retention left them with the power of spending only $4.5 million at the mega-auction. At the auction, they bought back some of their star players of previous seasons such as Hussey, Ashwin, Bollinger and Subramaniam Badrinath. In the 2011 IPL, they lost three of their first five games which placed them at the bottom of the ten-team points table. But then, they went on to win seven of their next eight games to finish second and register a spot in the knockout stages. They faced the top-ranked team Royal Challengers Bangalore in the Qualifying final which they won by 6 wickets thanks to an unbeaten 73 from Suresh Raina. In the final, they faced the same opponents again, which was held at their home ground Chepauk. Vijay and Hussey put on a 133-run first-wicket partnership that helped the Super Kings to post a total of 205/5. Their bowlers, then, restricted Bangalore to only 147 to take the Super Kings to the second consecutive title in the IPL. Vijay was awarded Man of the Match for his match-winning innings of 95. CSK also won all their home games that season becoming the first team in IPL to achieve the feat. However at the Champions League later that year, they won only one out of their four group matches and finished at the bottom.

In 2012, the franchise signed up Indian all-rounder Ravindra Jadeja for $2 million at the players' auction. They got off to a rather slow start in the regular season, winning only five of their first 12 games which put them in doubt of qualifying for the Playoffs. Then they won three of their last four matches and qualified for the Playoffs with a better net run rate than the Royal Challengers who also finished with the same number of points. In the Eliminator, they beat the Mumbai Indians by 38 runs before comprehensively beating the table-toppers Delhi Daredevils in the Qualifying final by 86 runs. Murali Vijay, who struck his second IPL hundred (113 off 58 balls), won the Man of the Match. At the final, the Super Kings were defeated by 5 wickets by the Kolkata Knight Riders who chased down the target of 191 with two balls to spare, thus denying the Super Kings a hat-trick of titles in the IPL. At the Champions League, once again they could not progress past the group stage with two wins and two defeats.

In 2013, the Super Kings strengthened their bowling attack by signing up five overseas and five Indian bowlers. In the IPL season, they finished first in the points table with 11 wins from 16 matches and qualified for the Playoffs and 2013 CLT20. This was the first time in six seasons that the Super Kings had topped the league table of the IPL. During the season, they also equaled Royal Challengers Bangalore's 2011 record for most wins in succession in the IPL (7 wins on trot). In the first Qualifier at Delhi against Mumbai Indians, the Super Kings posted 192/1 in 20 overs riding on unbeaten half-centuries from Hussey (86* off 58 balls) and Raina (82* off 42 balls) before bowling out their opponents for 144. Thus they entered the final of the IPL for the fourth time in succession where they would play the same opponents, Mumbai Indians, at Kolkata. At the final, batting first, the Mumbai Indians made 148/9 in their 20 overs. In reply, the Super Kings were reduced to 39/6 at one stage before an unbeaten half-century from skipper Dhoni took them close to the target. However, Mumbai Indians won the match by 23 runs to win their first ever IPL title. Super Kings opening batsman Michael Hussey, who scored 733 runs that season at an average of 52, won the Orange Cap for the most runs in the season while all-rounder Dwayne Bravo won the Purple Cap for bagging the most wickets (32). The Super Kings gained direct qualification for the 2013 CLT20 which was held in India in September–October. They were placed in Group B alongside Brisbane Heat, Sunrisers Hyderabad, Titans and Trinidad & Tobago. They won their first three games before losing the final group match against Trinidad & Tobago. With 12 points from four matches, the Super Kings progressed to the semifinals where they suffered a 14-run defeat at the hands of the Rajasthan Royals at Jaipur.

In 2014, before the players' mega-auction, Chennai retained Dhoni, Raina, Jadeja, Ashwin and Bravo. The retention left them with a purse of 21 crores to spend at the auction. At the auction, the franchise bought the likes of Brendon McCullum, Dwayne Smith, Faf du Plessis, Ashish Nehra, Mohit Sharma among others. The first phase of the IPL season, as it coincided with the general elections, was held in UAE. The second phase returned to India, but the Super Kings' home matches were shifted from Chennai, due to "a deadlock between stadium authorities and the state administration", to JSCA International Stadium in Ranchi. The Super Kings started the season with a defeat in the opening match, after which they went on to win eight of their next nine matches to take the first spot in the points table. However, they suffered a loss of form towards the end of the regular season which resulted in three consecutive defeats. They won their last league fixture and finished third in the points table and qualified for the Eliminator against the fourth-placed Mumbai Indians. They won the Eliminator at Mumbai by 7 wickets and qualified for the Qualifier. At the Qualifier against Kings XI Punjab, the Super Kings won the toss and elected to field. Punjab went on to score 226/6 in their 20 overs. The Super Kings, in reply, could manage only 202/7 despite a 25-ball 87 from Raina. They crashed out of the IPL, but, on account of finishing third, qualified for the main event of the 2014 CLT20. In the group stage of the CLT20, the Super Kings won two matches, lost one while another match was a no result. Thus with 10 points they finished second in the group table and qualified for the semifinal where they met the unbeaten team of the other group, Kings XI Punjab. After being put in to bat, the Super Kings posted 182/7 in 20 overs thanks to Bravo who scored a 39-ball 67. Then their bowlers reduced Punjab to 34/6 in the eighth over, before eventually bowling them out for 117. At the final in Bangalore, the Super Kings faced the IPL champions Kolkata Knight Riders who set them a target of 181 in 20 overs. Raina guided the run-chase with an unbeaten 109 off 62 balls, helping the team to an eight-wicket win and their second CLT20 title. Super Kings spinner Pawan Negi who took 5/22 during Kolkata's innings won the Man of the Match, and Raina, who finished as the highest run-getter of the tournament, was awarded Man of the Tournament.

In 2015, before the players' auction, Chennai Super Kings gave away Ben Hilfenhaus, John Hastings, Vijay Shankar and David Hussey. At the auction they bought back Michael Hussey for a price of ₹1.5 crores. They also bought Kyle Abbott, Irfan Pathan, Andrew Tye, Eklavya Dwivedi, Ankush Bains, Pratyush Singh and Rahul Sharma. In the final, they lost against Mumbai.

2018–present

2018 
Ahead of the players mega auction, Chennai Super Kings retained Mahendra Singh Dhoni, Suresh Raina & Ravindra Jadeja. Additionally, Faf du Plessis and Dwayne Bravo were brought back into the side using RTM. The return of the Super Kings to the IPL was the cause of a large amount of celebration and fanfare amongst the fans, with a crowd of more than 10,000 turning up for the practice sessions held at the M. A. Chidambaram Stadium in Chennai before the start of the tournament.

Chennai's campaign started off with a thrilling one wicket win over the Mumbai Indians in the first match of the season thanks to an unbeaten 68 off 30 balls from Dwayne Bravo. Playing their first home game in Chennai, the Kings successfully managed to chase down a target of 202 set by the Kolkata Knight Riders, aided by a quickfire half-century by Sam Billings. The team then went on to lose to Kings XI Punjab in Mohali but bounced back by winning three matches in a row against the Rajasthan Royals, Sunrisers Hyderabad and Royal Challengers Bangalore. The Super Kings' next eight matches resulted in them alternating between victories and defeats by winning against the Delhi Daredevils, Royal Challengers Bangalore, Sunrisers Hyderabad and Kings XI Punjab and losing against the Mumbai Indians, Rajasthan Royals, Delhi Daredevils and the Kolkata Knight Riders. The league stage ended with the Super Kings in second place behind the Sunrisers. Chennai then went on to post back-to-back victories against the Sunrisers Hyderabad in the first qualifier and in the final to win the Indian Premier League for the third time since the inception of the tournament. Star all-rounder Shane Watson was ajudged Man of the Match for his 117* from 57 balls.

Three of the five centuries scored in the 2018 season were by players belonging to the Chennai Super Kings (Ambati Rayudu 100* and Shane Watson 106, 117*). The Super Kings also became the first team to defeat an opposing team (Sunrisers Hyderabad) four times in a single season.

2019 
In 2019, the Super Kings was the first team to qualify for the Playoffs. They entered the final of the IPL for the eighth time in the league. At the final, batting first, the Mumbai Indians made 149/8 in their 20 overs. In reply, the Super Kings were able to make just one short of Mumbai's total 148/7 and lost the title. Super Kings' star bowler of the season Imran Tahir, who took 26 wickets, won the Purple Cap for bagging the most wickets.

2020 
Before the 2020 season of the IPL, CSK roped in Sam Curran (₹5.5 crore), Josh Hazlewood (₹2 crore), Piyush Chawla (₹6.75 crore) and R. Sai Kishore (₹20 lakh). But due to the COVID-19 pandemic, the IPL was postponed and shifted to the UAE. CSK faced some early setbacks before the start of the season after cricketers Ruturaj Gaikwad and Deepak Chahar tested positive for the coronavirus. CSK's star batsman and vice-captain Suresh Raina and spinner Harbhajan Singh pulled out of the IPL citing personal reasons.

Despite the setbacks, CSK started the season off on a high by convincingly beating the defending champions Mumbai Indians in the inaugural game. But it was all downhill from here. CSK lost their next three games to the Rajasthan Royals, Delhi Capitals, and the Sunrisers Hyderabad. This was followed by an out-of-the-blue 10-wicket win over the Kings XI Punjab. The team then lost their next two matches to the Kolkata Knight Riders and the Royal Challengers Bangalore. CSK captain MS Dhoni drew a lot of criticism from the fans and supporters over his form and team selection after his comments on the team's youngsters lacking the "spark" to be backed by the management.

CSK were at the bottom of the table for most of the season and their play-offs hopes were crushed after facing a humiliating 10 wickets defeat against the Mumbai Indians.

CSK ended their campaign on a high note by winning their last three games against KKR, RCB, and KXIP, thanks to a hat-trick of fifties by youngster Ruturaj Gaikwad. He also became the first-ever CSK cricketer to score three consecutive fifties in the team's history. CSK finished 7th overall in the points table and failed to make the playoffs for the very first time.

CSK released many of their bad performers from the previous season like Piyush Chawla, Kedar Jadhav, and Murali Vijay before the player auctions for the 2021 season of the IPL. Shane Watson had announced his retirement following the conclusion of CSK's campaign.

2021 
During the 2021 auctions, CSK picked up Test specialist Cheteshwar Pujara for the base price of Rs 50 lakh while spending a whopping Rs 9.25 crore on Krishnappa Gowtham, making the spinner the most expensive uncapped Indian buy ever. They also bought English all-rounder Moeen Ali for Rs 7 crore. Along with the three, CSK brought some uncapped Indian talents like Harishankar Reddy, Bhagath Varma, and Chezhian Harinishanth for their base price of Rs 20 lakh each. Rajasthan Royals player Robin Uthappa was traded to the Super Kings as well.

CSK began the first leg of the 2021 season with a loss against Delhi capitals. After that, they carried a consecutive 5-match winning streak, followed by a defeat against Mumbai Indians. Following the second wave of the COVID-19 pandemic, and the rise in COVID-19-positive cases in many team camps, the IPL was suspended midway and postponed.

When the second leg of the IPL resumed in the UAE, CSK carried a consecutive 4-match winning streak and thus, ensured its berth in the playoffs. CSK was the first team to qualify for playoffs in the 2021 season. CSK completed the league stage by losing the last 3 matches. Yet, CSK managed to remain within the top 2 places in the points table throughout the season.

In Qualifier 1, CSK beat Delhi Capitals to storm into finals for the 9th time in their history. In the finals, CSK showcased an all-round performance against KKR to clinch their 4th IPL title.

2022 
In January 2022, CSK became India's first unicorn sports enterprise. CSK unveiled their New Jersey for IPL 2022. On 24 March, two days before the start of the season, CSK announced that Ravindra Jadeja will captain CSK after MS Dhoni decided to step down as captain. On 30 April, Jadeja decided to give up his captaincy to focus more on his game. MS Dhoni was named the captain again. Under Jadeja's captaincy, CSK lost 6 out of their first 8 matches.
Following their defeat against Mumbai Indians, CSK went out from the race of playoffs for the second time in their Ipl history .

Home ground 

The home ground of the Super Kings is the historic M. A. Chidambaram Stadium (commonly called "The Chepauk") located in Chennai. The stadium is named after former BCCI President M. A. Chidambaram. It is the oldest stadium in India which is in continuous use. The stadium is owned by the Tamil Nadu Cricket Association and has a seating capacity of 50,000 as of May 2013. In 2010, the stadium underwent a major renovation for hosting some of the matches of the 2011 ICC Cricket World Cup. The seating capacity was increased from 36,000 to 50,000 and three new stands were established during this renovation.

The Super Kings have a 70.91% win record at this venue, which is often referred to as "Fortress Chepauk" and "Lions' den". In the 2011 season, the Super Kings won all their home games (8 matches) including the final against Royal Challengers Bangalore. The Super Kings thus became the first team to win all their home games in a season and also the first team to win the tournament at home.

In 2014, Chennai Super Kings played all their home matches at Ranchi due to issues with Government of Tamil Nadu.

In 2018, Chennai Super Kings managed to play only a solitary home game, against Kolkata Knight Riders (KKR), in Chennai due to members of a few fringe political parties staging protests outside the stadium as well as several parts of the city, demanding that IPL matches to be moved out of the city until the Cauvery Management Board (CMB) was set up as directed by the Supreme Court of India. Despite tight security for the match against KKR, the Chennai police expressed their inability to ensure sufficient personnel at the venue for the smooth conduct of the remaining games. The remaining six home matches of Chennai Super Kings were moved to the Maharashtra Cricket Association Stadium in Pune.

Players 

Mahendra Singh Dhoni, who was the captain of the Indian limited-overs team in 2008, was bought by the Super Kings for $1.5 million at the 2008 players' auction. He was the most expensive player in the IPL until 2009 when the Super Kings signed up English all-rounder Andrew Flintoff for $1.55 million. Dhoni is one of the most successful captains in the IPL, having led the Super Kings to nine finals of which the team has won four.

The vice-captain of the team from 2008 to 2015 was Suresh Raina. Raina holds multiple IPL records such as most caps, most runs and most catches. Australian batsman Michael Hussey has the best batting average for the Super Kings. He was the first batsman from the Super Kings to score a century in the IPL. After Matthew Hayden's retirement in 2010, Hussey took over his place of opening batsman and was the team's leading run-scorer in 2011 and 2013 seasons. Murali Vijay, who played for the team from 2009 to 2013, is the first Indian batsman to score two centuries in the IPL. Super Kings' spinner Ravichandran Ashwin has the third best economy rate in IPL (6.53) and is the third leading wicket-taker for the team behind Dwayne Bravo and Ravindra Jadeja.

Identity

Name, logo, crest and colors 
The Chennai franchise named the team as Chennai Super Kings to honour the rulers of the Tamil empire. The word "super" is used commonly in southern India especially in Tamil Nadu. The team name also derives from India Cements' brand "Coromandel King".

The team logo features the head of a roaring lion in orange and the team name rendered in blue. The crown above the team name is the same as that used in the logo of the brand Coromandel King. According to the logo designers, since the lion is the king of the jungle, the roaring lion logo reflects the team name. The details of the logo signifies various qualities such as youth, vibrancy, solid performance orientation and fiery spirit.

The team's primary colour is yellow with blue and orange stripes on either sides of the jersey. The jersey also incorporates the roaring lion logo in the center of the shirt below the logo of the main sponsor. The basic look of the jersey has remained the same from the first season with no changes except for the sponsor placement. The kit manufacturer until 2014 was Reebok and from 2015, Australian Apparel and Sports Gear manufacturer Spartan manufactures kits for the team.

Theme song 
The team's theme song is the "Whistle Podu" designed by Aravind–Shankar (duo of Aravind Murali and Jaishankar Iyer). Although the track was created only for YouTube in 2008, it gained popularity during the 2009 season and later became the team's theme song. The video of the song represents the street dance form of dappangutthu which is very popular among certain communities in Tamil Nadu. It is also a folk dance and music genre employed in Tamil cinema. The recordings of some of the Super Kings players whistling were used in the music video.

Kit and sponsors 
Myntra signed a deal for principal shirt sponsor for the 2021 Season. Muthoot Group was one of the principal shirt sponsors, having signed a three-year deal in 2018. Telecom service provider Aircel was the previous shirt sponsor after they signed a three-year deal in 2008 which was then renewed in 2011 for 850 million, then the most expensive sponsorship deal in IPL. The team also has sponsorship deals with India Cements, Gulf Oil, Equitas Small Finance Bank, HIL, Nippon Paint, Parle Agro Frooti and Atria Convergence Technologies. For the 2022 season tyre maker TVS Eurogrip signed up with the franchise as the principal shirt sponsor. Chennai Super Kings said this partnership would allow them to connect with the team's pan-India fanbase through engagement initiatives.

Support and fan following
The Super Kings have a large fan following across India, colloquially referred to as "Yellow Army". The team has an official fan club called the "Whistle Podu Army" which was founded in January 2016 after the team's suspension from IPL. In 2018 and 2019, there were reports of over 10,000 fans turning up to watch the team's practice sessions. After the team's home games were moved to Pune in 2018, the Super Kings management arranged a charter train between Chennai and Pune, as well as free accommodation, for more than 1,000 fans of the team.

Brand value 
Chennai Super Kings was adjudged by Brand Finance to be the most valuable brand at 65 million after the completion of 2018 IPL. The Economic Times commissioned UK-based Brand Finance to carry out brand evaluation of the IPL and also each of the eight franchise teams (that was increased to 10 in 2011). Chennai Super Kings was rated as the "most valuable team" in the Indian Premier League in 2010–11, with a brand value of $100
million (approximately 2.24 billion). In February 2013, London based Brand Finance evaluated the top 150 most valuable teams in the world, in which Chennai Super Kings is placed in the 147th place valued at $46 million, just behind the Mumbai Indians. In October 2021, Chennai Super Kings was valued at $900 million on track to become the first sports unicorn from India.

Controversies

Ownership of N. Srinivasan 
Until September 2008, BCCI regulation, Clause 6.2.4 stated that "No administrator could have, directly or indirectly, any commercial interest in the matches or events conducted by the board". However, N. Srinivasan, who was then the treasurer and vice-chairman of BCCI, became the de facto owner of the Chennai Super Kings since he was the managing director of India Cements. Former BCCI President A. C. Muthiah wrote to the BCCI regarding the violation of this clause in 2008 but the BCCI did not respond. In September 2008, Muthiah went to the Madras High Court to restrain BCCI from allowing Srinivasan to participate in the general body meeting where the election was to be held. However, the suit was dismissed by the High Court and the following day, Srinivasan was elected as the Secretary of BCCI. The clause was amended as "No administrator shall have, directly or indirectly, any commercial interest in any of the events of the BCCI, excluding IPL, Champions League and Twenty20". Muthiah then moved to the Supreme Court which gave a split verdict in April 2011. Later in August 2011, Muthiah filed another petition to stop Srinivasan from taking over as the BCCI President but the Supreme Court rejected the petition, and Srinivasan was elected the President of BCCI.

In 2011, the owners of other teams were concerned about the possible rigging that could have taken place in the IPL auctions. Nita Ambani, the owner of Mumbai Indians questioned the changing order of players just before the auction began. Former IPL chairman Lalit Modi accused Srinivasan of arm-twisting him and rigging the 2009 IPL auction to ensure that English all-rounder Andrew Flintoff was bought by the Chennai Super Kings while it was refuted by Srinivasan.

2013 betting scandal 

In May 2013, Gurunath Meiyappan, son-in-law of Srinivasan, was arrested by Mumbai Police on charges of placing bets on IPL matches. Meiyappan, who was the Team Principal of the Super Kings, was issued a summons by the Mumbai Police and on interrogation it was found that Meiyappan was in contact with bookies through actor Vindu Dara Singh. Mumbai police arrested Meiyappan for betting offence. Following this, Srinivasan, on 2 June 2013, decided to step aside as BCCI President temporarily until the inquiry into the betting case is completed. In February 2014, the three-member panel appointed by the Supreme Court of India enquired into the betting case, and indicted Meiyappan for illegal betting during the 2013 IPL.

IPL suspension 

On 25 March 2014, the Supreme Court of India issued an ultimatum to the Board of Control for Cricket in India demanding that Srinivasan either step down as president or be removed from his position. On 14 July 2015, the RM Lodha Committee suspended the owners of Rajasthan Royals and Chennai Super Kings from the Indian Premier League for a period of two years. On 24 February 2016, the Supreme Court of India agreed to hear a plea for lifting the ban on the Chennai Super Kings.

Statistics

Overall results 

Last updated: 21 May 2022

 Abandoned matches are counted as NR (no result)
 Win or loss by super over or boundary count are counted as tied.

Source: ESPNcricinfo

Rivalries

Rivalry with Mumbai Indians 

Chennai Super Kings and Mumbai Indians have played against each other more number of times than any other two teams in the IPL. They are the two most successful IPL teams and often termed as "big spenders" at the players auction. The two sides have met each other at the final of the IPL four times, with Mumbai winning thrice and Chennai winning once. The rivalry is often referred to as El Clasico of IPL.

Rivalry with Royal Challengers Bangalore 
The rivalry with Chennai Super Kings stems from the Kaveri River water dispute between the states of Karnataka and Tamil Nadu. The rivalry is also called "Kaveri derby" and "South Indian derby". The Super Kings beat the Royal Challengers in the final of the 2011 IPL, the only meeting between the two teams at an IPL final.

Seasons

Indian Premier League

Champions League T20

Current squad 
 Players with international caps are listed in bold.

Administration and support staff

Result summary

By season

Last updated: 15 October 2021

1 Tied match - CSK lost in a tiebreaker on one-over-eliminator ("Super Over")
Tied+Win - Counted as a win and Tied+Loss - Counted as a loss
NR indicates no result

By opposition
This section include records against an individual team.

Last updated: 21 October 2021

Overall results in the Champions League T20 competition 

Last updated: 19 December 2018

In popular culture 

In 2019, Disney+ Hotstar produced a documentary web series titled Roar of the Lion. The series followed the Chennai Super Kings' comeback season of 2018 edition after serving a two-year ban for their involvement in the 2013 Indian Premier League betting case. The series was shot across Chennai, Mumbai and Delhi in India and in Australia and featured Chennai Super Kings players such as MS Dhoni, Ravindra Jadeja, Ambati Rayudu, Shane Watson, Dwayne Bravo, Deepak Chahar and Suresh Raina. This series is the first one to be released under the label Hotstar Specials. The series premiered on 20 March 2019, in Tamil and Hindi languages.

See also 
 List of Chennai Super Kings cricketers
 List of Chennai Super Kings records

References

External links 
Chennai Super Kings at IPL official site

 
Sport in Chennai
Cricket clubs established in 2008
Sports clubs in India
Indian Premier League teams
Cricket in Chennai
2008 establishments in Tamil Nadu
India Cements